Park Circus is a neighbourhood of Central-East Kolkata, in Kolkata district, West Bengal, India.

Park Circus may also refer to:
 Park Circus (company), a Scottish film distribution company
 Park Circus, Glasgow, a street in Park District, Glasgow, Scotland